Higby Mountain or Mount Higby , is a traprock mountain ridge located  east of Meriden, Connecticut. It is part of the narrow, linear Metacomet Ridge that extends from Long Island Sound near New Haven, Connecticut, north through the Connecticut River Valley of Massachusetts to the Vermont border. Higby Mountain is known for its high cliff faces, unique microclimate ecosystems, and rare plant communities. The mountain is traversed by the  Mattabesett Trail.

Geography
Higby Mountain is an important aquifer; two reservoirs and one pond lie at the base of it: Higby Mountain Reservoir at its east foot; Adder Reservoir, on the upper eastern slope; and Black Pond between Besek Mountain and Higby Mountain. Camel's Hump, est. , also called The Pinnacle is a prominent southern high point on the ridge just above a shallow gap called Preston Notch. (The Pinnacle should not be confused with a similarly named peak on Talcott Mountain, or with Pinnacle Rock of Farmington, Connecticut, both part of the Metacomet Ridge to the north of Higby Mountain). Interstate 91 cuts through the gap between Higby Mountain and Chauncey Peak to the north.  
   
The Metacomet Ridge continues northwest from Higby Mountain as Chauncey Peak and south as Besek Mountain. The north and east sides of Higby Mountain drain into Fall Brook, then Sawmill Brook, then the Mattabesett River, thence to the Connecticut River and Long Island Sound. The west and south side drain into Harbor Brook thence into the Quinnipiac River and Long Island Sound.

Geology and ecology
Higby Mountain, like much of the Metacomet Ridge, is composed of basalt, also called traprock, a volcanic rock. The mountain formed near the end of the Triassic Period with the rifting apart of the North American continent from Africa and Eurasia. Lava welled up from the rift and solidified into sheets of strata hundreds of feet thick. Subsequent faulting and earthquake activity tilted the strata, creating the cliffs and ridgeline of Higby Mountain. Hot, dry upper slopes, cool, moist ravines, and mineral-rich ledges of basalt talus produce a combination of microclimate ecosystems on the mountain that support plant and animal species uncommon in greater Connecticut. Higby Mountain is also an important raptor migration path. (See Metacomet Ridge for more information on the geology and ecosystem of Higby Mountain).

Recreation and conservation
Activities enjoyed on the mountain include hiking, snowshoeing, bird watching picnicking, and other passive pursuits. Swimming, boating, and fishing are prohibited in the reservoirs but fishing and boating are allowed on Black Pond. The Mattabesett Trail (maintained by the Connecticut Forest and Park Association), which stretches from the northern end of Lamentation Mountain, south to Totoket Mountain and north again to the Connecticut River, traverses the ridgeline of Higby Mountain. Higby Mountain has two trailheads. The second trailhead is located at the north end of the mountain at the junction of Miner Street and Interstate 91, exit 20 in Middletown; parking is permitted along the road.

The Nature Conservancy maintains a  reservation on the south ridgeline of Higby Mountain. The town of Middletown owns part of the mountain, both as open space and as watershed. Black Pond, undeveloped and scenic, is part of the Black Pond Wildlife Management Area.

Threats to the ecosystem and ridgeline of Higby Mountain include development and quarrying. In 2000, Higby Mountain was included in a study by the National Park Service for the designation of a new National Scenic Trail now tentatively called the New England National Scenic Trail, which would include the Metacomet-Monadnock Trail in Massachusetts and the Mattabesett Trail and Metacomet Trail trails in Connecticut.

The Meriden Land Trust and the  Middlesex Land Trust have been active in conserving the viewshed of Higby Mountain.

See also
 Metacomet Ridge
 Adjacent summits:

References

External links
 Connecticut Forest and Park Association
 NPS brochure for National Scenic Trail proposal.
 Middlesex Land Trust
 Meriden Land Trust

Middletown, Connecticut
Metacomet Ridge, Connecticut
Tourist attractions in Middlesex County, Connecticut
Mountains of Connecticut
Middlefield, Connecticut
Landforms of Middlesex County, Connecticut
Nature reserves in Connecticut
Protected areas of Middlesex County, Connecticut
Nature Conservancy preserves